This is a list of media outlets in the city of Calgary, Alberta, Canada.

Radio

The city of Calgary has 33 terrestrial radio stations in which 8 are on the AM frequency and around 30 on the FM frequency.

On November 9, 2011, a number of applications were filed to the CRTC for new radio stations to serve Calgary.

Television

CTV Two Alberta ceased broadcasting over-the-air in Calgary on August 31, 2011.

The incumbent cable television provider in Calgary is Shaw Cable. Network programming from the United States is received on cable via  affiliates from Spokane, Washington.  While prime time in most of Canada runs from 8 pm to 11 pm, American prime time shows on weekdays run from 9 pm to midnight in Calgary, since Spokane is in the Pacific Time Zone.  Although Calgary is in the Mountain Time Zone, many of the American cities closer to Calgary didn't have full network service until the late 1980s.  Calgary has more than double the population of the Spokane stations' American coverage area.  In particular, Spokane's PBS member station, KSPS-TV, has long relied on viewership in Calgary.  Except for PBS, HDTV network programming is from Seattle, not Spokane.

On digital cable, U.S. network programming (in standard definition) is available from Detroit, Michigan in the Eastern Time Zone.  Prime time shows on weekdays run from 6 to 9 pm. Via digital cable, Calgary customers can also receive broadcasts from other CTV and CBC markets across Canada.

See also .

Newspapers

Daily (paid purchase)
 Calgary Herald - Broadsheet format. Owned by Postmedia Network.
 Calgary Sun - Tabloid format. Owned by Postmedia Network.

Daily (free)
 Metro News, a Calgary franchise of Metro International

Weekly
 Epoch Times - The general consensus among scholars and professors is that The Epoch Times is a "mouthpiece" of the Falun Gong movement, "heavily biased",  and "lacks credibility." It has been called a "known disinformation operation."
 Coffee news - weekly fun news and community business marketing tool displayed primarily in local restaurants and coffee shops.
 Vision Times Calgary - free weekly Chinese newspaper that focus on balanced and in-depth reporting and promote traditional Chinese culture.
 Sing Tao - free weekly Chinese newspaper, pro-communist paper with self-censored news.

Monthly
 City Light News - A Christian monthly newspaper.
 BeatRoute- Monthly alternative arts paper.
 Kerby News - a seniors-focused newspaper published out of the Kerby Centre
 The Calgary Journal - Community-focused newspaper with an aim to cover stories that are not covered heavily by other major media outlets.
Calgary's Child Magazine - Family friendly focused magazine with parenting tips, news and local advertisers.

Student
The city's four major post-secondary institutions publish student-run newspapers that are circulated throughout Calgary: 
The Gauntlet (University of Calgary)
The Journal (Mount Royal University)
The Reflector (Mount Royal University)
The Weal (Southern Alberta Institute of Technology).

Defunct
The following newspapers served Calgary and area, but are no longer published.
The Albertan - broadsheet daily which served Calgary from 1901 to 1980, at which point it was replaced by the tabloid-format Calgary Sun.
North Hill News - community weekly founded in the 1950s; later amalgamated with The Calgary Mirror.
The Calgary Mirror - community weekly, c.1970s to 2001; published by Sun Media during its final decade.
Fast Forward Weekly (FFWD) - free weekly newspaper, published from 1995 to 2015
The Calgary Straight - alternative news/entertainment weekly published from 1998 to 2002. Short-lived Calgary expansion of B.C.'s The Georgia Straight.
FYI Calgary In-Print - community weekly published January to May 2001 by Sun Media as successor to the Mirror. Tied into a news website initiative of Sun Media; later, the idea was revived as 24 Hours.
Dose - free daily newspaper, 2005–2006, published by CanWest. Later became a website. Succeeded by RushHour.

See also

 List of newspapers in Canada
 List of radio stations in Alberta
 List of television stations in Alberta

References

External links

Calgary-related lists
Calgary